The Great Dog Island, also known as Big Dog Island, and part of the Great Dog Group within the Furneaux Group, is a  granite island, located in Bass Strait, lying south of the Flinders Island and north of the Cape Barren Island, in Tasmania, in south-eastern Australia.

The island is private property and has been severely affected by grazing livestock, fire, muttonbirding and the introduction of exotic animals.  The island is part of the Franklin Sound Islands Important Bird Area, identified as such by BirdLife International because it holds over 1% of the world populations of six bird species.

History

George Robinson visited the island in the 1830s and records sealers taking mutton birds there in 1837.

Great Dog Island Group
The Great Dog Island Group includes:

 Great Dog Island
 Little Green Island
 Billy Goat Reefs
 South East Great Dog Islet
 Little Dog Island
 Samphire Island
 Fisher Island
 Fisher Island Reef
 Briggs Islet
 Spences Reefs

Flora and fauna

The island's vegetation is dominated by the grass Poa poiformis, aided by the burrowing and fertilising activities of the shearwaters in conjunction with regular burning-off.  However, at the north-eastern side of the island, there is a remnant mixed forest community, rare within the Furneaux Group, of manna gum and Acacia verticillata with various species of Allocasuarina, Melaleuca and Leptospermum.

Recorded breeding seabird and wader species are short-tailed shearwater (about 300,000 pairs), white-faced storm-petrel, sooty oystercatcher and pied oystercatcher.  Reptiles present include the metallic skink, spotted skink, eastern three-lined skink, eastern blue-tongued lizard, lowland copperhead and tiger snake.  A native mammal recorded from the island is the rakali, along with introduced mice, rats and feral cats.

See also

 List of islands of Tasmania

References

Furneaux Group
Important Bird Areas of Tasmania
Islands of North East Tasmania
Private islands of Tasmania
Islands of Bass Strait